The 38th National Film Awards, presented by Ministry of Information, Bangladesh to felicitate the best of Bangladeshi Cinema released in the year 2013. Ceremony took place in Dhaka, and awards were given by then Prime Minister of Bangladesh.

List of winners

See also
Meril Prothom Alo Awards
Ifad Film Club Award
Babisas Award

References

External links

 2013
2013 film awards
2015 awards in Bangladesh
2015 in Dhaka
April 2015 events in Bangladesh